The Malian Women's Championship also called Women's Ligue 1 is the top flight of women's association football in Mali. The competition is run by the Malian Football Federation.

History
Women's football was born in Mali on 1994 by the creation of the Bamako League. This league was held every year until 2014. It was dominated essentially by Super Lionnes d'Hamdallaye and AS Mandé who both won many titles.

On 2016, the Malian Football Federation created the first national women's championship.

Champions
The list of champions and runners-up:

Most successful clubs

See also
 Malian Women's Cup

References

External links 
Women's Football - MaliFootball.com

 
Women's association football leagues in Africa
Women
2016 establishments in Mali
Sports leagues established in 2016